Ashridge Wood is a  biological Site of Special Scientific Interest south-west of Compton in Berkshire. It is in the North Wessex Downs, which is an Area of Outstanding Natural Beauty.

The wood is a surviving section of a once larger ancient coppiced woodland, although part was planted with conifers during the 20th century. It has many flowering woodland plants, including an abundance of Spiked Star-of-Bethlehem Ornithogalum pyrenaicum. 

A visit by the Reading & District Natural History Society in June 2009 identified 34 species of flowering plants, 7 different lichens on Ash trees within the wood, and 22 species of insects.

References

 
Sites of Special Scientific Interest in Berkshire